Saran Kaba Jones (born on 21 June 1982) is a clean water advocate and social entrepreneur from Liberia. She is the founder of FACE Africa, an organization working to strengthen water, sanitation and hygiene (WASH) infrastructure and services in rural communities across sub-Saharan Africa. She is World Economic Forum Young Global Leader and a 2016 TIME Magazine Next Generation Leader. Her work with FACE Africa has been profiled in the Boston Globe, and CNN Inside Africa.

Background and education 
She was born from Monrovia, Liberia where she lived up the age of eight years and she moved with her parents and 3 brother to Cote de 'Ivoire in 1989 because to the civil war that broke out. She lived there for two years with her mother's family and they moved to Egypt in 1991 when her father was appointed ambassador of the government of Liberia to the middle east. She spent four years in Egypt and two years in Cyprus before moving to the United States for college at  Lesley college, Cambridge Massachusetts then transferred to Harvard College where she studied Government and International Relations.

Career 
She spent five years working for a private equity for the Singapore government's Economic Development Board, a job she left in August 2010 to concentrate on FACE Africa.

Awards and recognitions 
2015 
 MTV Africa Music Leadership Award

2013 
 Guardian UK: listed as one of Africa's 25 Top Women Achievers 
 2013 World Economic Forum Young Global Leader 
 
2012 
 Longines/ Town&Country "Women Who Make A Difference' Award 
 Black Enterprise as one of 10 International Women of Power to Watch 
 Daily Muse "12 Women to Watch"

2011
 Applause Africa "Person of the Year" award 
 Voss Foundation's Women Helping Women Honoree 
 Huffington Post "Greatest Person of the Day"  
 Forbes Magazine's 20 Youngest Power Women In Africa

References

External links
 Forbes: How Africa And Africans Are Responding To The Ebola Crisis
 All Africa: Liberian Named Young Global Leader
 Global Pulse: In the fight for gender equality in Africa, clean water plays a key role 
 The Boston Globe: Boston groups helping Liberia respond to Ebola outbreak 
 Salt and Diageo's 100 Inspiring Women
 All Africa: Liberia, RiverCess to Benefit From Hand-Pumps

American people of Liberian descent
Water in Liberia
1982 births
Living people
People from Monrovia
Harvard College alumni